Ratna (रत्न) (also Rathna or Rathan) is a Sanskrit term for "jewel". It is also a popular female Hindu name.

Ratna may refer to:

People
 Ratna, Queen Mother of Nepal (born 1928), Queen Consort of Nepal from 1955 to 1972
 Ratna Fabri, museologist of India 
 Ratna Pathak (born 1963), Indian actress of Bollywood films
 Ratna Sari Devi Sukarno (born 1940), one of the wives of the first President of Indonesia, Sukarno
 Ratna Singh (born 1959), Indian politician from the Indian National Congress party

Other uses
 The 14 ratnas that emerged from the sea of milk during the Samudra manthan
 The Ratna is the pinnacle of a Hindu temple
 Bharat Ratna, India's highest civilian award
 Karnataka Ratna, highest civilian honour of the State of Karnataka

See also
 Ratner (disambiguation)